Vladislav Uzunov (born 25 May 1991) is a Bulgarian professional footballer who plays as a midfielder.

Career
On 23 June 2017, Uzunov signed a contract with Slavia Sofia.

Club statistics
As of 22 March 2010

Honours
Slavia Sofia
 Bulgarian Cup (1): 2017–18

References

External links
 
 

1991 births
Living people
Bulgarian footballers
First Professional Football League (Bulgaria) players
Association football midfielders
PFC Lokomotiv Mezdra players
OFC Sliven 2000 players
FC Dimitrovgrad players
PFC Kaliakra Kavarna players
FC Haskovo players
PFC CSKA Sofia players
PFC Dobrudzha Dobrich players
FC Lokomotiv Gorna Oryahovitsa players
PFC Slavia Sofia players
FC Botev Vratsa players
FC Krumovgrad players